Xiaozhu is a consumer-to-consumer short-term home and apartment rental platform based in Beijing, China.  The company was founded by Kelvin Chen Chi, a doctor from Chengdu, in 2012.

As of 2018, Xiaozhu had an approximately 21.6% market share among Chinese short-term rental platforms.  Its main competitors within China are Tujia and Airbnb.

In October 2018, Xiaozhu closed a $300 million funding round led by Yunfeng Capital. A tech unicorn, the company has an estimated valuation of more than one billion dollars.

References

External links

Chinese companies established in 2012
Companies based in Beijing